Six/Nine is the eighth studio album by the Japanese rock band Buck-Tick. It was released in a clear purple case on May 15, 1995, through Victor Entertainment. It peaked at number one on the Oricon chart. It was certified gold in the same month and sold over 240,760 copies in the first year. Issay (Der Zibet) provides vocals for "Itoshi no Rock Star". "Rakuen (Inori Koinegai)" caused controversy because some of the lyrics were lifted from the Quran and later the album was re-issued with the offending part removed by November 1995 in a clear case. The album was digitally remastered and re-released on September 19, 2002, with a bonus track. The album remastered once again and released on September 5, 2007, in a clear red case.

Track listing

Personnel
 Atsushi Sakurai - lead vocals, saxophone
 Hisashi Imai - lead guitar, backing vocals, lead vocals on "Aikawarazu no "Are" no Katamari ga Nosabaru Hedo no Soko no Fukidamari"
 Hidehiko Hoshino - rhythm guitar, keyboards, backing vocals
 Yutaka Higuchi - bass
 Toll Yagami - drums, percussion

Additional performers
 Susanne Bramson - backing vocals
 Aska Strings - violin
 Kazutoshi Yokoyama - keyboards
 Issay - vocals on "Itoshi no Rock Star"

Production
 Hitoshi Hiruma; Gary Stout - producers, recording, mixing
 Hisashi Imai; Buck-Tick - producers
 Takafumi Muraki; Osamu Takagi - executive producers
 Hirohito Fujishima; Shinichi Ishizuka - engineers
 Kenichi Arai; Hiroshi Tanigawa - assistant engineers
 Kazushige Yamazaki - mastering
 Ken Sakaguchi - graphic design
 Robert Longo - cover art
 M-Hasui - photography

References

External links
 
 
 

1995 albums
Buck-Tick albums
Japanese-language albums
Victor Entertainment albums